Gateway Towers is a 27-story residential skyscraper near Point State Park in Downtown Pittsburgh.  Constructed in 1964, it was built as a luxury apartment building.  During 1979–1980, it was converted to luxury condominiums by Commonwealth Fort. By 1987, 94 remaining units were sold by auction.

Gateway Towers underwent a $3 million capital improvement in 2006.  Overall, it has  in 308 residential units.

References

External links

Gateway Tower Website

Residential skyscrapers in Pittsburgh
Residential buildings completed in 1964
1964 establishments in Pennsylvania